Monomacra is a genus of flea beetles in the family Chrysomelidae. There are some 120 species, from the Nearctic and Neotropics.

Species

 Monomacra andreinii Bechyné, 1957
 Monomacra azureipennis
 Monomacra bumeliae (Schaeffer, 1905)
 Monomacra carinata Jacoby, 1902
 Monomacra corallina (Fleutiaux & Sallé, 1889)
 Monomacra dagoberta
 Monomacra dixira
 Monomacra elongata (Jacoby, 1884)
 Monomacra guadeloupensis Bechyné, 1956
 Monomacra guazapa
 Monomacra opaca Wilcox, 1953
 Monomacra sesquifasciata
 Monomacra sinusops
 Monomacra sponsa Clark, 1865
 Monomacra violaceipennis
 Monomacra xanthosoma
 Monomacra yepezi

References

Further reading

 

Alticini
Chrysomelidae genera
Articles created by Qbugbot
Taxa named by Louis Alexandre Auguste Chevrolat